Ronald George Rowe (11 October 1902 – December 1977) was an English amateur footballer who played in the Football League for Brentford as a wing half. He made over 300 appearances in non-League football for Wimbledon and Hayes and is a member of the latter club's Hall of Fame.

Personal life 
Rowe was the father of table tennis sisters Rosalind and Diane Rowe and his older brother Vivian was also an amateur footballer. He attended Latymer Upper School.

Career statistics

Honours 
Hayes
 London Senior Cup: 1931–32
Individual

 Hayes Hall of Fame

References

1902 births
1977 deaths
Footballers from Fulham
English footballers
Association football wing halves
Wimbledon F.C. players
Brentford F.C. players
Hayes F.C. players
Hendon F.C. players
Uxbridge F.C. players
Pinner F.C. players
English Football League players
Isthmian League players
People educated at Latymer Upper School